John James Lowery (born 1979) is a Jersey international lawn bowler.

Bowls career
Lowery won the fours bronze medal at the 2009 Atlantic Bowls Championships in Johannesburg.

He has represented Jersey at three Commonwealth Games. At the 2006 Commonwealth Games he competed in the triples, at the 2010 Commonwealth Games he competed in the pairs, where he reached the quarter finals, just missing out on a medal and finally at the 2014 Commonwealth Games he took part in both the triples and fours events.

References

1979 births
Living people
Jersey bowls players
Bowls players at the 2006 Commonwealth Games
Bowls players at the 2010 Commonwealth Games
Bowls players at the 2014 Commonwealth Games